This is a list of railway museums in the United Kingdom.

England 
 Amberley Working Museum, Arundel, West Sussex
 Astley Green Colliery Museum, Astley, Greater Manchester
 Bahamas Locomotive Society
 Barrow Hill Engine Shed
 Beamish museum
 Bere Ferrers railway station
 Bideford Railway Heritage Centre, Devon
 Bishop's Castle Railway Museum
 Bressingham Steam Museum, Norfolk
 Bristol Harbour Railway and Industrial Museum
 Buckinghamshire Railway Centre, Buckinghamshire
 Cambrian Heritage Railways, Oswestry, Shropshire
 Coleford Great Western Railway Museum, Coleford, Gloucestershire
 Colonel Stephens Railways Museum, Tenterden
 Crewe Heritage Centre, Crewe
 Darlington Railway Centre and Museum (Recently renamed: Head of Steam)
 Devon Railway Centre, Devon
 Didcot Railway Centre
 Doncaster Railway Works, Doncaster, South Yorkshire
 Great Central Railway (Nottingham)
 East Anglian Railway Museum
 Heritage Shunters Trust
 Hollycombe Steam Collection
 Hopetown Carriage Works
 Kew Bridge Steam Museum
 Kidderminster Railway Museum
 London Transport Museum
 Locomotion, Shildon, County Durham (free entry)
 Mangapps Railway Museum
 Market Drayton Railway Preservation Society
 Monkwearmouth Station Museum, Sunderland
 Mid-Suffolk Light Railway, Suffolk
 Middleton Railway, Leeds, West Yorkshire
 Moseley Railway Trust
 Museum of Rail Travel, Ingrow (West), Keighley
 National Railway Museum, York, North Yorkshire (free entry)
 National Tramway Museum, Crich, Derbyshire
 North Ings Farm Museum
 North Woolwich Old Station Museum
 Northamptonshire Ironstone Railway Trust
 Pendon Museum
 Rushden Station Railway Museum
 Rutland Railway Museum, Rutland
 Shillingstone Railway Project, Dorset
 Somerset & Dorset Railway Heritage Trust
 Southall Railway Centre
 Statfold Barn Railway, Tamworth
 Stratford on Avon and Broadway Railway
 Steam - Museum of the Great Western Railway, Swindon
 Stephenson Railway Museum, North Shields
 Tiverton Museum of Mid Devon Life, Devon
 Tyseley Locomotive Works
 Walthamstow Pump House Museum
 Westonzoyland Pumping Station Museum, Bridgwater

Scotland
 Alford Valley Railway
 Faeming and Railway Visiting Centre
 Ferryhill Railway Heritage Centre
 Glasgow Museum of Transport
 Glenfinnan Station Museum
 Invergarry & Fort Augustus Railway Museum
 Leadhills and Wanlockhead Railway
 Maud Railway Museum
 Scottish Industrial Railway Centre
 Friends of The Kyle Line

Wales
Narrow Gauge Railway Museum – Gwynedd
Conwy Valley Railway Museum, Betws-y-Coed
Griffithstown Railway Museum (closed 2011)
Penrhyn Castle Railway Museum

Northern Ireland
Ulster Folk and Transport Museum
Whitehead Railway Museum

Isle of Man
Jurby Transport Museum
Port Erin railway museum

Channel Islands
 Pallot Heritage Steam Museum

See also
List of British heritage and private railways
Heritage railways in Northern Ireland
List of heritage railways
Mountain railway
List of Conservation topics
Conservation in the United Kingdom
List of railway companies
British Rail

References

British railway museums
Heritage railways in the United Kingdom
Railway
 
United Kingdom